Events from the year 1661 in Germany.

Births 

 Margravine Dorothea Charlotte of Brandenburg-Ansbach
 Christian Heinrich, Margrave of Brandenburg-Bayreuth-Kulmbach
 Christian Wernicke
 Georg Böhm
 Ignaz Agricola
 Johannes Moller

Deaths 

 Gottfried Scheidt
 Johann Hülsemann
 Christoph Bach
 Johannes Pharamund Rhumelius
 Johann Cothmann
 August Buchner
 Theophil Großgebauer

1660s in the Holy Roman Empire